Macari District is one of nine districts of the Melgar Province in Peru. The capital of the district is Macari.

Limits 
Nort: Layo District
South: Cupi District
East: Chuquibambilla
West: Cusco Department

Geography 
Other mountains are listed below:

Ethnic groups 
The people in the district are mainly indigenous citizens of Quechua descent. Quechua is the language which the majority of the population (84.25%) learnt to speak in childhood, 15.55% of the residents started speaking using the Spanish language (2007 Peru Census).

References